Ramadier is a French surname. Notable people with the surname include:

Jean Ramadier (1913–1968), French colonial administrator in West Africa
Paul Ramadier (1888–1961), French politician
Pierre Ramadier (1902–1983), French Olympic pole vaulter

French-language surnames